Strepterothrips is a genus of thrips in the family Phlaeothripidae.

Species
 Strepterothrips africanus
 Strepterothrips apterus
 Strepterothrips arake
 Strepterothrips barbatus
 Strepterothrips biconus
 Strepterothrips brasilianus
 Strepterothrips conradi
 Strepterothrips floridanus
 Strepterothrips moffati
 Strepterothrips okajimai
 Strepterothrips orientalis
 Strepterothrips parvulus
 Strepterothrips tuberculatus
 Strepterothrips uenoi
 Strepterothrips verruculus

References

Phlaeothripidae
Thrips
Thrips genera